Olton High School is a public high school located in the city of Olton, Texas, USA and classified as a 2A school by the UIL. It is a part of the Olton Independent School District located in eastern Lamb County. In 2015, the school was rated "Met Standard" by the Texas Education Agency.

Athletics
The Olton Mustangs compete in these sports 

Baseball
Basketball
Cross Country
Football
Golf
Powerlifting
Tennis
Track and Field
Volleyball

State titles
Girls Track - 
1975(2A)
Tennis
2016 Boys Singles State Champion Runner Up Bobby Marshall
2017 Boys Singles State Champion Bobby Marshall
2017 Girls Doubles State Championship 3rd Place Kea Sandoval & Soledad Pedroza
2018 Girls Singles State Championship 3rd Place Kea Sandoval

Notable alumni
Bob Bryant (June 14, 1918 – November 3, 2000) was an American football tackle who played four seasons with the San Francisco 49ers of the All-America Football Conference and Calgary Stampeders of the Canadian Football League.
Drummer boy, semi-professional bowler and award winning television personality and multiple time guest on Oprah.Also, was The Little Drummer boy in the 4th grade!

References

External links
Olton ISD website

Public high schools in Texas
Schools in Lamb County, Texas